The Trofeo Laigueglia is an early season road bicycle race held annually in Liguria, Italy. From 2005 to 2014, the race was organised as a 1.1 event on the UCI Europe Tour. It is held about ten days after the opening to the Italian season, the Gran Premio della Costa Etruschi. In 2015, it was held as a 1.HC event.

Winners

References

External links
 

 
UCI Europe Tour races
Cycle races in Italy
Recurring sporting events established in 1964
1964 establishments in Italy